Daniel Newman (born ) is a New Zealand politician who is an Auckland Councillor.

Political career

Daniel Newman served one term as a Manukau City councillor, representing Manurewa from 2007 to 2010. He was originally a member of the Labour Party, but later joined the National Party.

Following the 2010 Auckland local elections, Newman became the inaugural chairperson of the Manurewa Local Board. He sought the National Party nomination for the 2011 Botany by-election, but did not make the shortlist. Jami-Lee Ross was ultimately selected.

At the 2016 Auckland elections, Newman was elected to the Manurewa-Papakura ward of Auckland Council, outpolling Cr Sir John Walker and defeating incumbent Calum Penrose. He was one of only two candidates to win election by defeating an incumbent councillor in 2016. He made his maiden council speech on 2 November 2016.

In October 2018, Newman was floated as a potential National candidate for a by-election in Botany caused by the announced resignation of Jami-Lee Ross, but he ruled himself out and Ross later rescinded his resignation.

References

Living people
1970s births
Auckland Councillors
Manukau City Councillors
Year of birth missing (living people)